Vishvajit Malla (Nepali: विश्वजित मल्ल) was a Malla dynasty king and the King of Patan. He succeeded Rajya Prakash Malla and reigned from 1758 until his death in 1760.

Life 
According to a chronicle, he was a son of Vishnu Malla's daughter. He was assassinated by the nobles at the gate of Taleju temple in 1760. The nobles then installed Jayaprakash Malla of Kantipur to rule Patan.

References

1760 deaths
Nepalese monarchs
Year of birth unknown